is a self-cover album by Chara, which was released on February 18, 2004. It debuted at #27 on the Japanese Oricon album charts, and charted in the top 300 for 5 weeks. It eventually sold 19,000 copies.

The new versions featured a stripped down arrangement, self-produced by Chara and performed with her band.

Two songs were used as promotional tracks.

Track listing

Japan Sales Rankings

References
 	

Chara (singer) albums
2004 albums